Mimi Stillman is a professional concert flutist.

Career
Born in Boston, Massachusetts, Stillman became, at the age of 12, the youngest flute player ever admitted to the Curtis Institute of Music, where she studied with Julius Baker and Jeffrey Khaner. She obtained her Bachelor of Music degree in 1999. The same year she became the youngest wind player to win the Young Concert Artists. 

Stillman received an MA in history and was a Ph.D. candidate at the University of Pennsylvania. 

Regarding her performances, the New York Times has described her as "a consummate and charismatic performer." In 2012, she received the Women in the Arts award from Women for Greater Philadelphia.

She founded the Dolce Suono Ensemble in Philadelphia in 2005 and remains its executive and artistic director. The ensemble's commissioning program has led to the creation of 44 new works in eleven years.

Stillman is the host and performer on the Musical Encounters TV show and video The Magic Flute. She recorded the soundtrack for Kevin Bacon's film Loverboy.

On August 22, 2012, the 150th anniversary of Debussy's birth, she embarked on a project she titled "Syrinx Odyssey," with the goal to record herself playing her solo flute work Syrinx every day for a year, filmed in different locations over 366 days, with each new video performance posted online every day.

In 2013, Stillman became the first Shirley and Sid Curtiss Distinguished Faculty Chair, chamber music coach, and lead faculty member of the Settlement Music School's Shirley Curtiss Center for Woodwind Studies. She left the position in 2015.

In 2014, Stillman was inducted as an honorary member in Sigma Alpha Iota, together with Jennifer Higdon.

Selected publications
Claude Debussy, Nuits d'étoiles: Eight Early Songs, arr. Mimi Stillman for flute and piano (King of Prussia, Pa., 2002: Theodore Presser).

Mimi Stillman, "Debussy, Painter of Sound and Image", Flute Quarterly (Fall 2007): 41-46.

Mimi Stillman, "The Music of Dante's Purgatorio", Hortulus: The Online Graduate Journal of Medieval Studies 1, no. 1 (2005): 13-21.

Mimi Stillman, "Philadelphia's Changing Opera Landscape", NewMusicBox, 11 June 2012.

Mimi Stillman, "Into the Light: Mieczyslaw Weinberg's Five Pieces for Flute and Piano", The Flutist Quarterly (Winter 2016)

Selected recordings 
[Freedomhttp://www.innova.mu/albums/mimi-stillman-charles-abramovic/freedom Freedom]: Premiere recordings by Richard Danielpour, David Finko, and Mieczyslaw Weinberg. Mimi Stillman, flute and Charles Abramovic, piano, with Yumi Kendall, cello. Innova Recordings, 2015.

Odyssey: 11 American Premieres for Flute and Piano (2-CD set), Mimi Stillman, flute, Charles Abramovic, piano, Innova Recordings 814 (2011).

The Concertos of David Finko / Mimi Stillman, piccolo, with Orchestra 2001 and James Freeman, conductor. Centaur, 2013.

Jeremy Gill, Chamber Music, TROY1067.

Notes: Music from Four Continents, Mimi Stillman, flute, Allen Krantz, guitar. Direct-to-Tape DTR2021 (2012).

Mimi: Debut Solo Recording with Charles Abramovic, piano. Music by Poulenc, Debussy, premieres by Daniel Dorff and Lawrence Ink, Astor Piazzolla, and Brazilian choros. Dolce Suono, 2004.

Video recording of George Crumb's "Vox Balaenae" ("Voice of the Whale") for Curtis Performs.

References

External links 

Dolce Suono Ensemble
Mimi Stillman YouTube Channel

Living people
American flautists
Year of birth missing (living people)
Curtis Institute of Music alumni
Musicians from Boston